The 1988 MLB Japan All-Star Series was the second edition of the championship, a best-of-seven series between the All-Star teams from Major League Baseball (MLB) and Nippon Professional Baseball (NPB), then-called All-Japan.

MLB won the series by 3–2–2 and Barry Larkin was named MVP.

Results 
Championship

Rosters

MLB All-Stars roster

NPB All-Stars (All-Japan) roster

References

MLB Japan All-Star Series
1988 in Japanese sport
1988 in baseball